Brownsville is an unincorporated community in White County, Illinois, United States.

Notable people
King Brockett, baseball player, was born in Brownsville.
Margaret Mayo, playwright, was born in Brownsville.

Notes

Unincorporated communities in White County, Illinois